Melanodera is a genus of Patagonian seed-eating birds in the tanager family Thraupidae.

Taxonomy and species list
The genus Melanodera was introduced in 1850 by the French naturalist Charles Lucien Bonaparte with the white-bridled finch (Melanodera melanodera) as the type species. The genus name combines the Ancient Greek melas meaning "black" and dera meaning "neck". The genus now contains two species.

References

 
Bird genera
Taxa named by Charles Lucien Bonaparte